Tammy is a 2014 American road comedy film directed and co-written by Ben Falcone and produced, co-written by, and starring Melissa McCarthy as the title character. The film also stars Susan Sarandon, Allison Janney, Gary Cole, Mark Duplass, Nat Faxon, Toni Collette, Sandra Oh, with Dan Aykroyd, and Kathy Bates. The film tells the story of a woman named Tammy who hits the road with her profane, alcoholic grandmother after finding out her husband is cheating. Tammy was released in theaters on July 2, 2014.

Although a box office success, grossing $100.3 million from a $20 million budget, it received highly negative reviews from critics with McCarthy and Sarandon receiving Razzie nominations for Worst Actress and Worst Supporting Actress respectively.

Plot
In Murphysboro, Illinois, Tammy Banks strikes a deer on the way to her job at the fast food restaurant Topper Jack's, damaging her vehicle; when she arrives late, her supervisor, Keith Morgan, is forced to fire her from the restaurant after becoming fed up with Tammy's tardiness and laziness. After her car breaks down on the way home on Illinois Route 13, she walks home to find her husband, Greg, eating a romantic meal with their neighbor, Missi. Tammy leaves in frustration and walks two doors down to her parents' house.

She tells her mother, Deb, about her plans to leave and takes her grandmother Pearl's Cadillac DeVille. Pearl requests to come along. Tammy initially refuses but ultimately agrees when Pearl proves that she has a large sum of cash. Tammy has beer with Pearl, and the next morning they wake up near a park where Pearl convinces Tammy not to go back home. Pearl wants to go to Niagara Falls with Tammy since she hadn't gone as a child. Along the way the two stop in a bar in Louisville, Kentucky, Tammy meets Earl Tillman and his son Bobby, and Earl hooks up with Pearl. Tammy and Bobby begin to make a love connection as Pearl and Earl drunkenly make out in the car. Bobby gives Tammy his number to call him so he can pick up Earl. Back at the hotel, Tammy is forced to sleep outside. The next morning, Bobby picks up Earl, and the two leave. Tammy, infuriated with Pearl, leaves her, but returns after feeling guilty. Tammy and Pearl are arrested after Pearl gets caught buying a case of beer for two teenagers as well as shoplifting a pint of whiskey for herself. Tammy is released, but Pearl stays at the jail for possessing illegal prescription drugs.

To bail out Pearl, Tammy robs a Topper Jack's, where she converses with employees Becky (Sarah Baker) and Larry (Rich Williams). Finally having obtained the money, she rushes to the prison to bail Pearl out, but Bobby has already bailed her out. With the help of Pearl's wealthy lesbian cousin Lenore, they destroy the car to hide the evidence from the robbery. The two then stay at the home of Lenore and her wife, Susanne. At a 4th of July party thrown at the house, Pearl gets drunk and humiliates Tammy by making rude comments about her weight and appearance in front of all the guests. After Tammy runs off to the dock on the lake by the house, Lenore follows her with both comfort and some tough love.

Tammy brings coffee to Pearl, who is presumably asleep outside. After repeatedly trying to wake her, Pearl does not wake up and Tammy assumes she is dead. She, Lenore, and Susanne grieve Pearl's death, but Pearl suddenly awakens, much to everyone's shock. Pearl was actually unconscious due to the large amount of alcohol she drank the previous night. Tammy is relieved, and she tearfully demands Pearl to get help for her drinking problem. The ambulance arrives and takes Pearl to the hospital. The police arrive as well, and Tammy is arrested for her robbery of Topper Jack's.

Tammy is released from prison 38 days later, and her father, Don, picks her up. He offers to kill Greg for her, though she declines. Returning home, Tammy finds that Greg and Missi have packed Tammy's belongings. She and Greg agree to an amicable divorce. She walks down the street to her parents' place and finds out that Pearl is now living in Brookview Retirement Home. Tammy goes to Brookview to break her out, but Pearl is actually happy there. She has been attending Alcoholics Anonymous meetings at the home, and she is dating one of the men there. However, they do still take a trip to Niagara Falls.

At Niagara Falls, Bobby surprises Tammy there and they kiss. Tammy tells him about her choice to move to Louisville to get a fresh start in life and get closer to him. Missi leaves Greg to be with Keith and Tammy befriends Becky and Larry.

Cast

 Melissa McCarthy as Tammy Banks, the titular character
 Susan Sarandon as Pearl Balzen, Deb's mother, Don’s mother-in-law and Tammy's grandmother
 Kathy Bates as Lenore, Pearl's cousin
 Allison Janney as Deb, Tammy's mother
 Dan Aykroyd as Don, Tammy's father
 Mark Duplass as Bobby Tillman, Tammy's love interest
 Gary Cole as Earl Tillman, Bobby's father and Pearl's love interest
 Nat Faxon as Greg Banks, Tammy's husband
 Toni Collette as Missi Jenkins, Tammy and Greg's neighbor and Greg's love interest
 Sandra Oh as Susanne, Lenore's wife
 Ben Falcone as Keith Morgan, Tammy's supervisor at a local Topper Jack's Fast Food 
 Sarah Baker as Becky, an employee at the Topper Jack's, where Tammy commits a robbery
 Rich Williams as Larry, an employee at the Topper Jack's, where Tammy commits a robbery
 Mark L. Young as Jesse
 Mia Rose Frampton as Karen
 Steve Little as Jet Ski Renter
 Steve Mallory as Cashier
 Damon Jones as Jerry Miller
 Sandy McCarthy as one of two ladies leaving bar

Production
On November 17, 2011, was reported that New Line Cinema acquired Melissa McCarthy’s script Tammy, about an overweight woman who is laid off from her job, discovers her husband is having an affair, and decides to go on a road trip with her alcoholic, foul-mouthed, diabetic grandmother. Tate Taylor and Beth McCarthy-Miller were in talks to direct the project, but the deals were never done and Melissa McCarthy's husband, Ben Falcone was chosen to direct the film.

Casting
On October 18, 2012, it was announced that Shirley MacLaine has been offered the role of Tammy's diabetic grandmother, but the deal never came to fruition due to her scheduling conflicts with the TV series Downton Abbey. Debbie Reynolds was also considered for the role. On March 20, 2013, Susan Sarandon took the role of the grandmother. Sarandon wore prosthetic ankles to reflect her character's diabetes. Kathy Bates joined the cast to play the grandmother's lesbian cousin. In March 2013, Mark Duplass joined the cast as Tammy's love interest. On April 4, Allison Janney was cast to play Tammy's mother. On April 5, Dan Aykroyd joined the cast of the film.

Filming
Principal photography began May 3, 2013 in Wilmington, North Carolina. Other filming locations include the surrounding areas of Shallotte, North Carolina, Castle Hayne, North Carolina and Boiling Spring Lakes, North Carolina. Also brief footage was filmed in Louisville, Kentucky and Niagara Falls, New York.

Release
The first official full-length trailer of the film was released on May 6, 2014. On June 3, three posters for the film were released. On June 16, the UK trailer for the film was revealed.
The film was released in July 2014.

Box office
Tammy grossed $84.5 million in North America and $16 million in other territories for a total gross of $100.3 million, against its $20 million budget. The film grossed $6.2 million on its opening day, and $21.6 million in its opening weekend, finishing second place at the box office (behind Transformers: Age of Extinction).

Reception

Critical reception
Tammy received generally negative reviews from critics. On Rotten Tomatoes, the film has an approval rating of 24% based on 185 reviews with an average rating of 4.4/10. The site's critical consensus reads, "Melissa McCarthy remains an engaging screen presence, but her efforts aren't enough to keep the jumbled Tammy on track." On Metacritic, the film has a score of 39 out of 100 based on 36 critics, indicating "generally unfavorable reviews". Audiences polled by CinemaScore gave the film an average grade of "C+" on an A+ to F scale.

Ian Buckwalter of NPR gave the film a mixed review saying "Tammy never quite manages to find that balance between the sweet and the smartass the way Bridesmaids did, nor does the mismatched buddy dynamic between McCarthy and Sarandon ever approach the success of The Heat. But eventually the film does manage to find its own awkward way, with enough effective and less desperate jokes to smooth things over after the rocky start. It's a shakier debut of McCarthy and Falcone's efforts behind the camera than one might have hoped for, but if Tammy can turn things around, surely they can too." Eden Caceda of Filmink gave a negative review, saying, "McCarthy plays the same foul-mouthed and distasteful character she’s played in just about every movie since Bridesmaids."

Accolades

Notes

References

External links

 
 
 
 
 

2014 films
2014 romantic comedy films
American romantic comedy films
Films directed by Ben Falcone
Films produced by Adam McKay
Films produced by Melissa McCarthy
Films produced by Will Ferrell
Films set in Illinois
Films shot in North Carolina
Films shot in New York (state)
Films with screenplays by Ben Falcone
Films with screenplays by Melissa McCarthy
Dune Entertainment films
Gary Sanchez Productions films
New Line Cinema films
Warner Bros. films
Films set in Louisville, Kentucky
2014 directorial debut films
Films scored by Michael Andrews
2010s English-language films
2010s American films